Jane C. S. Long is an American energy and climate scientist. She was Associate Director at the Lawrence Livermore National Laboratory and is a fellow of the American Association for the Advancement of Science. 

Long is the Kravis Senior Contributing Scientist, and the Environmental Defense Fund.

Life 
Long received her bachelor's degree in biomedical engineering from the Brown University School of Engineering and her master's and doctorate from the University of California, Berkeley.

From 1997 to 2003 Long served as the dean of the Mackay School of Earth Sciences and Engineering at the University of Nevada, Reno.

Long currently works as a climate strategist at the California Council on Science and Technology.

Works

References

Living people
American climatologists
Lawrence Livermore National Laboratory staff
Brown University School of Engineering alumni
University of California, Berkeley alumni
University of Nevada, Reno faculty
Year of birth missing (living people)